Tale of the Pipa ( "Tale of the Pipa" or "The Story of the Lute") is a Chinese nanxi play written by the playwright Gao Ming during the late Yuan dynasty. There are French, German, English translations of the play, and an English novelization-translation.

It was the most popular drama during the Ming dynasty, and it became a model for Ming drama as it was the favorite opera of the first Ming emperor Zhu Yuanzhang.

Plot

The play is set during the Han dynasty. Based on an older play, Zhao zhen nü (The Chaste Maiden Zhao), it tells the story of a loyal wife named Zhao Wuniang (T: 趙五孃, S: 赵五娘, P: Zhào Wǔniáng, W: Chao Wu-niang) who, left destitute when her husband Cai Yong is forced to marry another woman, undertakes a 12-year search for him. During her journey, she plays the pipa of the play's title in order to make a living. The original story sees Zhao killed by a horse and Cai struck by lightning, however in Gao Ming's version the two are eventually reconciled and live out their lives happily. Gao reportedly composed The Lute over a three-year period of solitary confinement, locking himself in an attic room and wearing down the floorboards by tapping out the rhythms of his songs.

The Lute won considerable critical acclaim amongst Gao's contemporaries, since it raised the popular and somewhat rustic form of Southern folk opera to a high literary standard, and it became a model for Ming dynasty theatre. It was a favourite play of the first Ming Emperor Zhu Yuanzhang, who commanded that it be performed every day at court.

Translations
Antoine (A. P. L.) Bazin wrote a French translation in 1841. This version, titled Le Pi-pa-ki ou l'Histoire de Luth, was published in Paris in 1841 by the Imprimerie Royale. A group of Chinese students in Boston performed an English-language version of the play in 1925, translated by Y.H. Ku and Liang Shih-chiu, and acted by Liang and Bing Xin among others. Vincenz Hundhausen wrote a German translation in 1930.  A complete English translation and study by Jean Mulligan appeared in 1980. 

Memoirs of the Guitar, published in Shanghai in 1928, is an English-language novel self-described as "A Novel of Conjugal Love, Rewritten from a Chinese Classical Drama". The author was Yu Tinn-Hugh and the publisher was the China Current Weekly Publishing Company.

Adaptations
A 1946 American musical comedy based on the Chinese play, titled Lute Song, was written by Will Irwin and Sidney Howard. This adaptation was produced on Broadway. It starred Yul Brenner and Mary Martin. Cyril Birch, collaborator in a translation of The Peach Blossom Fan, wrote that presumably the basis of the American play was the A. P. L. Balzin French translation of the Chinese play.

References

Bieg, Lutz. "Literary translations of the classical lyric and drama in the first half of the 20th century: The "case" of Vincenz Hundhausen (1878-1955)." In: Alleton, Vivianne and Michael Lackner (editors). De l'un au multiple: traductions du chinois vers les langues européennes Translations from Chinese into European Languages. Éditions de la maison des sciences de l'homme (Les Editions de la MSH), 1999, Paris. , 9782735107681.
Birch, Cyril. "Introduction: The Peach Blossom Fan as Southern Drama." In: K'ung, Shang-jen. Translators: Chen, Shih-hsiang and Harold Acton. Collaborator: Birch, Cyril. The Peach Blossom Fan (T'ao-hua-shan). University of California Press, 1976. .
 
Das traditionelle chinesische Theater Vom Mongolendrama bis zur Pekinger Oper (Volume 6 of Geschichte der chinesischen Literatur, Wolfgang Kubin, 9783598245404). K.G. Saur. Walter de Gruyter, 2009. , 9783598245435.
Liu, Wu-Chi. An Introduction to Chinese Literature. Greenwood Publishing Group, 1990. , 9780313267031.
Tanaka, Issei. The Social and Historical Context of Ming-Ch'ing Local Drama (Chapter 5). In: Johnson, David, Andrew J. Nathan, and Evelyn S. Rawski (editors). Popular Culture in Late Imperial China. University of California Press, 1985. p. 143. , 9780520061729.

Notes

External links

 "The Lute." (Archive) World Digital Library
  "Gao Ming (c. 1305- c. 1370): Yuefu yushu (Xin qiejing xuan gujin Yuefu gundiao xinci yushu ying) / Pipa ji." - 1599 illustrated version at the Royal Danish Library
  French translation of Lute Song by A.P.L. Bazin:
 Version on the Hathi Trust Digital Library
 PDF version (Archive) and Word version (Archive)
 On Google Books:
 No. 1: Gao, Ming. Translator: Bazin, Antoine-Pierre-Louis. Le pi-pa-ki: ou, L'histoire du Luth : drame chinois de Kao-Tong-Kia représenté à Péking, en 1404 avec les changements de Mao-Tseu. (original document from Harvard University) L'Imprimerie royale, 1841.
 No. 2: Gao, Ming. Translator: Bazin, Antoine-Pierre-Louis. Le pi-pa-ki: ou, L'histoire du Luth : drame chinois de Kao-Tong-Kia représenté à Péking, en 1404 avec les changements de Mao-Tseu. (original document from Harvard University) L'Imprimerie royale, 1841.
 "Other Stories--"Tale of the Pipa"." (Archive) National Palace Museum.
  Info page: "Kao-tong-kia : Le Pi-pa-ki, ou l'Histoire du luth." (Archive) La Bibliothèque numérique sur la Chine ancienne.

Ming dynasty plays
Plays set in the 2nd century